Menuka Rawat (born 1972) is a Nepalese long-distance runner. She competed in the women's marathon at the 1988 Summer Olympics.

References

External links
 

1972 births
Living people
Athletes (track and field) at the 1988 Summer Olympics
Nepalese female long-distance runners
Nepalese female marathon runners
Olympic athletes of Nepal
Place of birth missing (living people)
20th-century Nepalese women